The 1964 United States Senate election in Texas was held on November 3, 1964. Incumbent Democratic US Senator Ralph Yarborough defeated future US President George H. W. Bush handily. This would prove to be Yarborough's final term as a senator. Bush later went on to win an election for the US House of Representatives in 1966 and was subsequently elected US Vice President in 1980, re-elected in 1984, and was elected president in 1988.

Democratic primary

Candidates
Gordon McLendon, radio broadcaster
Ralph Yarborough, incumbent Senator since 1957

Results

Republican primary

Candidates
George H. W. Bush, former Chairman of the Harris County Republican Party and son of former U.S. Senator from Connecticut Prescott Bush
Jack Cox, former State Representative from Stephens County and nominee for Governor in 1962
Milton Davis
Robert J. Morris, former New York City Municipal Court Judge, counsel to the U.S. Senate Judiciary Committee, and candidate for U.S. Senator from New Jersey in 1958 and 1960

Results

Runoff

General election

Results

See also 
 1964 United States Senate elections

References

Texas
1964
Senate
George H. W. Bush